Nate Fakes (age 43) is a Los Angeles-based cartoonist and author.

Early life & Career 
Nate has been creating comics commercially for about 11 years.

He was the campus newspaper's in-house cartoonist at Wright State University. Additionally, his writing has been published in Scholastic, The New York Times,  Warner Bros and MAD Magazine.

Nate is a member of the National Cartoonists Society.

In 2017, his book Laser Pointers, Hairballs, and Other Cat Stuff: A Small Collection of Cat Cartoons by Nate Fakes was published.

In 2022, his book A Fade of Light (2022) was published.

References 

Living people
American cartoonists